The pygmy bamboo bat (Tylonycteris pygmaeus) is a species of vesper bat in the family Vespertilionidae. It is found in Southwest China and was discovered in 2007.

References

Further reading
 Feng, Qing, Song Li, Yingxiang Wang, New Species of Bamboo Bat (Chiroptera: Vespertilionidae: Tylonycteris) from Southwestern China. Zoological Science 25(2): 225–234. 2008.  Zoological Society of Japan. 

Tylonycteris
Bats of China
Mammals described in 2008